Jonathan Roxmouth (born 25 February 1987) is a South African musical theater actor and singer, best known for his role as the Phantom in several productions of The Phantom of the Opera, including the world tour.

Early life
Roxmouth was born in Randburg, South Africa. He attended Northcliff High School, where he participated in annual theater productions. While in high school, Roxmouth also acted in musicals at the Natal Playhouse. Growing up, he participated in the Randburg Eisteddfod and earned diplomas in creative verse, light music/jazz, and voice.

Career
He began his professional career in 2006, playing Vince Fontaine/Teen Angel in the Barnyard Theatre Group's production of Grease, and has been acting in stage and musical productions since.

Stage roles

References

External links
Official website
Facebook page

Living people
1987 births
South African male musical theatre actors
South African male stage actors
People from Randburg